Jagmohanpur  is a village in Chanditala I community development block of Srirampore subdivision in Hooghly district in the Indian state of West Bengal.

Geography

Gram panchayat
Villages in Haripur gram panchayat are: Anantarampur, Bade Sola, Baghati, Ban Panchbere, Chak Bangla, Chota Choughara, Dudhkomra, Haripur, Ichhapasar, Jagmohanpur, Mamudpur and Radhaballabhpur.

Demographics
As per 2011 Census of India Jagmohanpur had a total population of 1,193 of which 600 (50%) were males and 593 (50%) were females. Population below 6 years was 105. The total number of literates in Jagmohanpur was 944 (86.76% of the population over 6 years).

Transport
Bara Choughara Street links it to Munsirhat-Mosat Road. Bargachia railway station and Baruipara railway station are the nearest railway stations.

Culture
Jatiya Sadharan Pathagar at Jagmohanpur was established in 1961.

References 

Villages in Chanditala I CD Block